Jubbal-Kotkhai Assembly constituency is one of the 68 constituencies in the Himachal Pradesh Legislative Assembly, covering the area of Jubbal, Kotkhai and Nawar.  Jubbal Kotkhai constituency is a part of Shimla Lok Sabha constituency.

Members of Legislative Assembly

Election candidates

2022

Election results

2021 by-election

2017

See also
 Jubbal Kotkhai
 Shimla district
 List of constituencies of Himachal Pradesh Legislative Assembly

References

External links
 

Assembly constituencies of Himachal Pradesh
Shimla district